The Face on the Bar-Room Floor is a 1923 American drama film directed by John Ford. It is considered to be a lost film. The film was adapted from the poem of the same name by Hugh Antoine d'Arcy.

Plot
As described in a film magazine, famous artist Robert Stevens (Walthall) is in love with Marion (Clifford). While spending a vacation along the cost of Maine, Robert paints a picture of one of the daughters of a fisherman (Saville). Some time later the body of the girl is found in the sea, and Robert is accused of being the cause of her death. Marion refuses to have anything more to do with him, and Robert drifts from bad to worse. He becomes the victim of some thieves who leave a stolen wallet on him, and he is sent to prison. During a prisoner uprising he escapes, but also saves the life of the Governor (MacGregor) who had been visiting the prison. Robert swims out to a small island and walks to the lighthouse where he finds the keeper ill and unable to keep his signal on. Robert flashes a light during a storm and thus protects the ships. He decides to return to prison, and on arrival finds a pardon awaiting him. Upon release, he returns to his old haunts and passes the Governor on the street. In a barroom, he is the subject of jests until he finally starts telling his story. He paints Marion's picture on the floor. Meanwhile, the Governor is at a dinner party and through a coincidence relates a story that makes Marion convinced that Robert has finally been found. Her brother confesses his guilt regarding the Fisherman's daughter which exonerates Robert. They go to him and bring him back, and in a while he has resumed his former life and is happy with Marion.

Cast
 Henry B. Walthall as Robert Stevens
 Ruth Clifford as Marion Trevor
 Ralph Emerson as Dick Von Vleck 
 Frederick Sullivan as Thomas Waring
 Alma Bennett as Lottie
 Norval MacGregor as Governor
 Michael Dark as Henry Drew
 Gus Saville as Fisherman

See also
List of lost films

References

External links

1923 films
1923 drama films
1923 lost films
Silent American drama films
American silent feature films
American black-and-white films
Films directed by John Ford
Fox Film films
Lost American films
Lost drama films
1920s American films
1920s English-language films